Lee Canyon is a canyon containing a small community and recreational area in the Spring Mountains located on in Clark County, Nevada, United States.  Primary access is via Lee Canyon Road.  Access to the adjacent Kyle Canyon and Mount Charleston, Nevada is via SR 158. It is 17 acres and is located at latitude: 36-18'31"N Longitude: 115-40'37"W. It is 8,510 ft above sea level.

Services
The Las Vegas Ski and Snowboard Resort is located at the top of Lee Canyon.
Camp Lee Canyon
Lee Canyon Fire Station staffed by the	Nevada Division of Forestry with a single  Type 3 Brush Engine.
Bristlecone Trail Loop
McWilliams Campground
Dolomite Campground
Old Mill Campground

Notes

Spring Mountains
Canyons and gorges of Nevada
Landforms of Clark County, Nevada
Humboldt–Toiyabe National Forest